Ugra is the name of several rural localities in Russia:
Ugra, Kaluga Oblast, a village under the administrative jurisdiction of the City of Kaluga in Kaluga Oblast
Ugra, Smolensk Oblast, a selo in Ugranskoye Rural Settlement of Ugransky District in Smolensk Oblast